Christian Ruud (born 24 August 1972) is a Norwegian former tennis player who turned professional in 1991. He achieved a career-high singles ranking of World No. 39 in October 1995, reaching the fourth round of the 1997 Australian Open and the quarterfinals of the 1997 Monte Carlo Masters. He retired in 2001 after the 2001 French Open. He was the highest ranked Norwegian male player ever on the ATP Tour until his son Casper Ruud surpassed him in February 2020.

Ruud was born in Oslo, and represented Norway at three consecutive Olympic Games, reaching the third round in Atlanta in 1996.

Ruud won twelve titles on the Challenger Series but reached only one ATP Tour final, losing the 1995 Swedish Open in Båstad to Fernando Meligeni in straight sets.

Personal life 
Ruud is married to Lele Ruud.

He is the father of tennis player Casper Ruud, who has reached world No. 2 in singles, as well as daughters Caroline and Charlotte.

Career titles

Singles (12)

Performance timeline

Singles

External links
 
 
 

1972 births
Living people
Sportspeople from Oslo
Norwegian male tennis players
Olympic tennis players of Norway
Tennis players at the 1992 Summer Olympics
Tennis players at the 1996 Summer Olympics
Tennis players at the 2000 Summer Olympics
20th-century Norwegian people